Zenas Beach (May 11, 1825 – July 28, 1898) was an American farmer, soldier, and politician.

Born in White County, Illinois, he moved to Prairie du Chien, Wisconsin Territory in 1846 and then to the town of Eastman, Wisconsin, in 1853 where he was a farmer. In 1846, Beach served in the United States Army during the Mexican–American War. Then during the American Civil War, Beach served in the 8th Wisconsin Volunteer Infantry Regiment as a first lieutenant. In 1875, Beach served in the Wisconsin State Assembly as a Republican. He died in Eastman, Wisconsin.

External links

References 

1825 births
1898 deaths
People from Prairie du Chien, Wisconsin
People from White County, Illinois
Farmers from Wisconsin
American military personnel of the Mexican–American War
People of Wisconsin in the American Civil War
Republican Party members of the Wisconsin State Assembly
19th-century American politicians
People from Crawford County, Wisconsin